Mark Angel (born 23 August 1975) is an English former professional footballer who played in the Football League for Boston United, Darlington, Oxford United, Sunderland and West Bromwich Albion. He also played for Scottish side as the Queen of the South. He later played non-League football for King's Lynn, Cambridge United, Stamford, Wisbech Town, Diss Town, Mildenhall Town, Newmarket Town, Bourne Town and Spalding United.

On 20 May 2015 he was appointed as manager of United Counties League side Boston Town, but left the club in February 2016.

References

English footballers
Walker Central F.C. players
Sunderland A.F.C. players
Oxford United F.C. players
West Bromwich Albion F.C. players
Darlington F.C. players
Queen of the South F.C. players
Boston United F.C. players
King's Lynn F.C. players
Cambridge United F.C. players
Stamford A.F.C. players
Wisbech Town F.C. players
Diss Town F.C. players
Mildenhall Town F.C. players
Newmarket Town F.C. players
Bourne Town F.C. players
Spalding United F.C. players
English Football League players
English football managers
Boston Town F.C. managers
1975 births
Living people
Association football midfielders
England semi-pro international footballers